The 1980 Cal Poly Mustangs football team represented California Polytechnic State University, San Luis Obispo as a member of the California Collegiate Athletic Association (CCAA) during the 1980 NCAA Division II football season. Led by 13th-year head coach Joe Harper, Cal Poly compiled an overall record of 10–3 with a mark of 2–0 in conference play, winning the CCAA title for the fifth consecutive season. The Mustangs advanced to the NCAA Division II Football Championship playoffs, where they lost shut out Jacksonville State in the quarterfinals, beat  in the semifinals, and upset No. 1-ranked Eastern Illinois in the title game, the Zia Bowl played in Albuquerque, New Mexico. During the regular season, two of the Mustangs three losses came at the hands of NCAA Division I-A opponents, Cal State Fullerton and Fresno State. Cal Poly also beat Boise State, the eventual NCAA Division I-AA champion. The Mustangs played home games at Mustang Stadium in San Luis Obispo, California.

Schedule

Team players in the NFL
The following Cal Poly Mustang players were selected in the 1981 NFL Draft.

The following finished their college career in 1980, were not drafted, but played in the NFL.

References

Cal Poly
Cal Poly Mustangs football seasons
NCAA Division II Football Champions
California Collegiate Athletic Association football champion seasons
Cal Poly Mustangs football